Eyrecourt, historically known as Donanaghta, is a village in County Galway, Ireland. Eyrecourt is on the R356 regional road 12 km west of the Banagher bridge over the River Shannon.

History
The Eyres after whom the village is named, as well as other places such as Eyre Square in Galway City, were an English family who came over with Cromwell. Their former residence, Eyrecourt Castle (now a ruin), provides the large metal gateway at the eastern end of main street and the  castle lawn beyond. The family were for many years closely associated with the local hunt, the Galway Blazers.

Amenities
The village stands midway along the Beara-Breifne Way; a historic way-marked way for walking, cycling and heritage. Eyrecourt is served by two public houses, library, shop, garage and fast food outlet, pharmacy, tractor dealership, medical centre, primary school, several small enterprises and the Meelick-Eyrecourt GAA club. Various groups and classes use the village hall, including for Pilates, martial arts, scouting, art classes, badminton and other sports. Local sporting clubs include a kayaking club.

Every second year in June the village hosts a festival of early machinery, the "Eyrecourt Vintage Festival", when old tractors, steam-engines and early farm machines are displayed. Each September Eyrecourt also hosts an agricultural show, which includes livestock shows and baking and gardening competitions.

Eyrecourt is approximately 70 km (1 hour by car) from Galway and 150 km (2 hours by car) from Dublin.

International relations

Eyrecourt is twinned with the village of Gouesnach in Brittany.

Parish

Within Dunanaughta there are two churches; the Catholic Church of St Brendan which has some notable stained glass windows, (the work of John Early of Dublin) and the Church of Ireland Church of St John the Baptist (an Anglo Gothic structure built in 1867). Meelick has the oldest Catholic church in Ireland with continuous use since 1414 AD. Clonfert has the grave of Saint Brendan "The Navigator" and Clonfert Cathedral (with its architecturally notable doorway), and a 14th-century statue of "Our Lady of Clonfert".

Transport
Eyrecourt is connected with one bus line. The local link line 547 connects Portumna and Ballinasloe with an intermediate stop in Eyrecourt. In Ballinasloe, the route ends at the train station where a connection can be made with trains for Galway and Dublin. Monday to Saturday, there are four journeys in each direction. On Sundays, only two journeys are made.

Notable people
Charles Burton, High Court judge
Cornelius Coughlan, Victoria Cross recipient
Roger Whittaker, singer-songwriter (born in Nairobi but lived in Eyrecourt)
Joe Salmon, Galway hurler grew up in Eyrecourt

See also
 List of towns and villages in Ireland
 List of steam fairs
 Market Houses in Ireland

References

Towns and villages in County Galway
Steam festivals